Agnes Simon (née Almási; 21 June 1935 – 19 August 2020) was an international table tennis player from Hungary.

Personal life
After the Hungarian Revolution of 1956, she fled to Sweden to seek political asylum, together with her husband and coach Béla Simon. They were accepted in the Netherlands and then in West Germany; thus Simon competed for the Netherlands in 1959–1960 and for West Germany since 1962.

Table tennis career
From 1953 to 1976, she won several medals in singles, doubles, and team events in the Table Tennis European Championships and in the World Table Tennis Championships.

Her three World Championship medals included a gold medal in the doubles at the 1957 World Table Tennis Championships with Lívia Mossóczy.

She also won three English Open titles.

See also
 List of table tennis players
 List of World Table Tennis Championships medalists

References

Hungarian female table tennis players
Hungarian expatriate sportspeople in the Netherlands
Hungarian expatriate sportspeople in Germany
1935 births
2020 deaths
Table tennis players from Budapest